Acacia blakei, commonly known as Blake's wattle or Wollomombi wattle, is a shrub belonging to the genus Acacia and the subgenus Juliflorae that is native to north eastern Australia.

Description
It has light green to brown coloured branchlets that are angular toward the apices but otherwise terete that are sometimes pruinose or scurfy. Like most species of Acacia it has phyllodes rather than true leaves. They are thinly coriaceous and usually glabrous and have two or three conspicuous longitudinal nerves and two or three less prominent nerves separate to the base. It blooms between August and November producing simple inflorescences that occur in groups of one to three in the axils. After flowering straight to curved seed pods form that are more or less flat except over the seeds.

Taxonomy
There are two known subspecies:
 Acacia blakei Pedley subsp. blakei
 Acacia blakei subsp. diphylla (Tindale) Pedley
The specific epithet honours the botanist Stanley T. Blake (1911–1973) who once worked for the Queensland Herbarium.

Distribution
It is endemic to central and eastern parts of southern Queensland as far north as Emerald and the Blackdown Tableland extending south to north eastern parts of New South Wales to around the Coxs River and Lake Yarrunga to the south west of Sydney. It is usually part of dry sclerophyll forest and woodland communities.

See also
List of Acacia species

References

blakei
Flora of Queensland
Flora of New South Wales
Taxa named by Leslie Pedley
Plants described in 1974